The Fungus is a novel by Harry Adam Knight published in 1985.

Plot summary
A scientist attempting to solve world hunger creates a fungus that mutates and spreads across all of England.

Reception
Dave Langford reviewed The Fungus for White Dwarf #66, and called it "revolting".

Reviews
 Review by Richard E. Geis (1985) in Science Fiction Review, Winter 1985
 Review by Tom Whitmore (1989) in Locus, #345, October 1989
 Review by Terry Broome (1990) in Paperback Inferno, #85
 Review by Justin Marriott (2020) in Pulp Horror: All Reviews Special Edition

References

1985 novels
English-language novels